A Little Stiff is a 1991 minimalist comedy directed by Caveh Zahedi and Greg Watkins based on true events and re-enacted by the actual participants. Caveh Zahedi plays himself as a neurotic film student who develops a crush on art student Erin McKim after a brief encounter in an elevator.

The film premiered at the Sundance Film Festival in 1991, aired on the Sundance Channel and German Television Station WDR, and was released on home video by World Artists.

The film was issued on DVD in 2015 as part of a box set of Zahedi's collected works called Digging My Own Grave: The Films of Caveh Zahedi.

Cast
Caveh Zahedi as Caveh
Erin McKim as Erin
Patrick Park as Patrick
Greg Watkins as Greg
Mike McKim as Erin's Father

References

 Official site

External links 
 
 

1991 films
1991 comedy films
Films directed by Caveh Zahedi
American comedy films
1990s English-language films
1990s American films